Felix Jeff Vulis (born 11 October 1955) is a Russian businessman. He is the chief executive of Eurasian Natural Resources Corporation plc (ENRC), a British multinational natural resources company.

Early life
Vulis graduated with an MSc degree in electrical engineering from the Novocherkassk Technical Institute and has an MBA from the Moscow State Institute of International Relations.

Career
He has been chief executive of ENRC since 20 August 2009, having joined the company in 2001. He resigned in February 2011, citing family commitments, but was reappointed in September 2011.

References

1955 births
Living people
American chief executives
American corporate directors
Moscow State Institute of International Relations alumni
20th-century American businesspeople